Trente Heavyn "Fivel" Stewart (born November 4, 1996) is an American actress and singer who first came to attention in her main cast role as Izzie in three seasons of the Netflix series Atypical (2018–2021). , she is in the main cast of the Netflix series The Recruit.

Early life 
Fivel Stewart was born in Beverly Hills, California. Her father, Nils Allen Stewart, is a professional stuntman. Her mother is of Japanese, Korean, and Chinese ancestry while her father is of Russian, Scottish, and Native American (Blackfoot) descent. Stewart is the younger sister of fellow actor Booboo Stewart as well as actress and stuntwoman Maegan Stewart. Stewart previously performed with siblings Booboo and Maegan as part of "TSC" (The Stewart Clan).

Career
Stewart has worked in the entertainment industry since the age of seven. She was the lead singer of the band My Allowance. She toured with Demi Lovato, Menudo, and Mitchel Musso. She has also been the lead singer in the band 5L, accompanied by her brother Booboo Stewart who plays the guitar.

Stewart began martial arts training in karate when she was five years old. She began competing at age six, becoming a 2002 and 2003 World Champion in Martial Arts, and was inducted into the Black Belt Junior Hall of Fame in 2003. She played the role of Izzie Taylor in the last three seasons of Netflix show Atypical.

Filmography

References

External links

 
 

1996 births
Living people
American people of Blackfoot descent
American people of Japanese descent
American people of Korean descent
American people of Russian descent
American people of Scottish descent
Actresses from Beverly Hills, California
American television actresses
21st-century American women